The Energy Journal is a quarterly peer-reviewed academic journal published by the International Association for Energy Economics and covering issues related to energy economics. It was established in 1980 and the editor-in-chief is Adonis Yatchew (University of Toronto).

Impact and reception
According to the Journal Citation Reports, the journal has a 2014 impact factor of 1.772, ranking it 23rd out of 88 journals in the category "Energy & Fuels".

See also

 Energy Economics
 List of economics journals
 List of energy journals
 Resource and Energy Economics

References

External links

Energy and fuel journals
Energy economics
English-language journals
Hybrid open access journals
Publications established in 1980
Quarterly journals